Destiny's Toy is a surviving 1916 American silent film written and directed by John B. O'Brien and starring Louise Huff. It was produced by Famous Players Film Company and released by Paramount Pictures. Print held in the Library of Congress collection and at George Eastman House.

Cast
Louise Huff as Nan
John Bowers as Reverend Robert Carter
J. W. Johnston as Thomas Carter
Harry Lee as Barnacle Joe
Mary Gray as Carter child
John T. Dillon as Bad Riley (credited as John Dillon)
Hattie Forsythe as Mrs. Carter
Tammany Young as Tick
Eddie Sturgis as Dopey (credited as Ed Sturgis)
Kate Lester as Mrs. Calvin
Florence Johns as Mrs. Calvin's Daughter

References

External links

 

1916 films
American silent feature films
Films based on short fiction
Paramount Pictures films
1916 drama films
American black-and-white films
Silent American drama films
Films directed by John B. O'Brien
1910s American films